Mitja Brulc (born 7 December 1979) is a retired Slovenian footballer.

External links
Profile at PrvaLiga 

1979 births
Living people
Sportspeople from Novo Mesto
Slovenian footballers
Association football forwards
Slovenian PrvaLiga players
NK IB 1975 Ljubljana players
ND Gorica players
NK Celje players
Molde FK players
NK Maribor players
FC Koper players
NK Krka players
Slovenian expatriate footballers
Expatriate footballers in Norway
Expatriate footballers in Iceland
Eliteserien players
Handknattleiksfélag Kópavogs players
Slovenia youth international footballers
Slovenia under-21 international footballers
Slovenian expatriate sportspeople in Iceland